Joel Kielbowicz (born April 20, 1983) is an American tennis player. He competed in the 2014 US Open Mixed doubles tournament, for which he received a wild card together with his compatriot Jacqueline Cako.

See also
Tennis in the United States

References

External links
 
 

1983 births
Living people
American male tennis players
Place of birth missing (living people)
21st-century American people